Nix Corner is an unincorporated community in the town of Clear Creek, Eau Claire County, Wisconsin, United States.

History
In 1871 Andrew Nix immigrated from Germany to Eau Claire County. Wisconsin. Finding very favorable conditions for starting a new life in America he wrote to encourage his half brother, John Hubert Nix, to also immigrate to America. John, and his wife, Anna Marie, followed Andrew in 1873.  Both Andrew and John bought farm land in Eau Claire County next to each other. Being devout Catholics and having no church available to their vicinity. John built a church on his land near his home. The church attracted other Catholics living on the surrounding farms to Sunday services and John Nix's home became kind of the hub for what evolved into a scattered informal farm community. John's house, being at a cross roads, inspired the name for this community, "Nix Corners."

Notes

Unincorporated communities in Eau Claire County, Wisconsin
Unincorporated communities in Wisconsin